Hugo Restrepo (born March 15, 1950) is a Colombian film producer, cultural critic and writer, whose work has exerted a profound influence on Colombian Neorealism and modern intellectual history. His most notable films include Sumas y restas, Rodrigo D No Futuro, and La Vendedora de Rosas. The latter have received numerous international awards. Rodrigo D No Futuro, and La Vendedora de Rosas were amongst the first Colombian films to be featured at the Cannes Film Festival. The ideas and dialogues presented in his films have been immortalised as part of Colombian popular culture.

Biography

Hugo Restrepo was born on 15 March 1950 in the city of Medellin, Colombia. Restrepo's father, also named Hugo Restrepo, founded a vast public and commercial transport industry during the early 20th century. Restrepo's mother, Fanny, was a house-wife.

From childhood, Restrepo appeared to be an introvert. During his school years, he revealed exceptional mathematical capabilities and a sense of humour. Restrepo had his primary and secondary education at the Pontifical Bolivarian University and later was awarded a degree in Geological Sciences and Geological Engineering at the Universidad Nacional de Colombia in Medellín.

Restrepo had always been interested in cinema; it was a hobby he had with a group of friends. They watched and talked about cinema and theatre, and later they started to produce movies.

After studying geological sciences and geological engineering, even when the conditions to produce cultural content in Colombia were very difficult, he saw cinema as an easier career. "Because going on field trips to investigate lands and other things that geology asks, was very dangerous in the 80s were there were threats everywhere by the guerrilla or other insurgent groups."

None of his productions can be named without remembering Victor Gaviria.

"I met him through a friend who we happened to have in common. Eager to start a production company I talked to my friend and by then Victor had already won a couple of awards writing, then his name sounded "- says Hugo. They founded Tiempos Modernos, one of the first producers of independent cinema in town, which started with Gaviria, Restrepo, and Jorge Mario Velez in 1983.

Years later, they sold Tiempos Modernos and started La Ducha Fria Producciones.

In 1992 Restrepo married the lawyer Maria Patricia Janet Schild-Ortiz. The following year they had a daughter.

Restrepo had written short stories for his friends and family, and although he was always involved with the screenplays of the movies he produced, it was not until Sumas y Restas that he decided to officially co-author one with Victor Gaviria.

Audiovisual and film productions
 "Sumas y restas" 35mm, 2004. Awards:
 Mejor Película Iberoamericana, Premio Ariel, Mexico (2006).
 IX Latin Film festival of Miami, United States. 
 Best screenplay, Ibermedia, Spain. 
 "India Catalina, festival de cine de Cartagena", Colombia. 
 "Premio ópera mayor de cinematografía", Colombia.
 "La Vendedora de Rosas", 1998. 
 "Rodrigo D no futuro", 1987. Awards: 
 Best film, New York Film Festival 1990, United States.
 "Premio Glauber Rocha de la prensa internacional en el festival de la Habana" 1990, Cuba.
 "Habitantes de la noche" 35mm, 1983.
 "La vieja guardia" 16mm, 1985.
 "Que pase el aserrador" ¾" 1985.
 "Los músicos" 16mm, 1986.
 "El paseo" 1988.
 "Dario Lemus, un retrato" ¾".
 "Los cuentos de Campo Valdés" ¾".
 "Mamá Margarita" ¾".
 "Lo que dañaba mi hermano era la edad" ¾".
 "Los polizones de Nueva colonia" ¾".
 "Mirar al muerto por favor" ¾".
 "Yo te tumbo, tú me tumbas" ¾".

Screenplays
 "Los músicos" 
 "Sumas y restas"

Short stories
 "El Ocio" 
 "Los Amigos no se Compran"
 "Cucarachas en mi Cabeza"

References

Colombian film producers
1950 births
Living people